Sussac is a commune in the Haute-Vienne department in the Nouvelle-Aquitaine region in west-central France.

It is also a local tourist resort offering lake, beach, play area and other amenities.

Demographics
Inhabitants are known as Sussacois.

See also
Communes of the Haute-Vienne department

References

External links

Communes of Haute-Vienne